Taxation in Finland is mainly carried out through the Finnish Tax Administration, an agency of the Ministry of Finance. Finnish Customs and the Finnish Transport and Communications Agency Traficom, also collect taxes. Taxes collected are distributed to the Government, municipalities, church, and the Social Insurance Institution, Kela.

Taxation by type

Total tax burden on labour
Taxes related to salary are paid both by the employee and the employer. The "gross salary" as reported to the employee conventionally does not include any of the taxes paid by the employer, which is a substantial portion of taxes. The employee personally pays municipal tax, state tax, and various minor taxes including contributions to mandatory insurance. The employer pays mandatory contributions to insurance and pension fees. The Finnish system does not require the employee to personally pay pension fees, and does not provide for voluntary contributions or employer matching.

Considering the sum of all mandatory fees on the total employer's salary expense, the marginal tax rate, i.e. the percentage of each additional €100 withheld, increases rapidly from 25% to 48% at €13,000/y, from 48% to 55% at €29,000/y, reaches 67% at €83,000 €/year and decreases slightly to 65% at €127,000/year (2018 data). This includes pension.

Different sources include different fees: the official calculator on the Tax Administration website at vero.fi includes only the employer contributions to tax, while the Taxpayers Association of Finland includes both employer and employee contributions. These give significantly different results.

Social Security Contributions
Every Finnish employee and their employer are required to pay into certain social funds. The taxation is in the form of a flat rate on the income of the employee. Employees with low income might not have to pay into all of the funds, and some contributions have a ceiling on the income that is taxable. The rates are shown in the following table:

The voluntary pension insurance fees or transfers to a personal pension account are credited in earned income taxation up to 5000 € per year.

According to Finnwatch 60–70% (€37 billion) of Finnish pension funds are invested in the tax havens. Political parties have different agendas in respect to tax havens.

Earned Income Taxes 
Earned gross income is taxed with proportional communal taxes paid to municipalities (16.5% – 22.5%, average 19.17%) and parishes (1.00% – 2.00%, average 1.34%), and a progressive state tax. There is an earned income tax credit for local taxes, making them slightly progressive despite their fixed rate. Low-income individuals in practice don't pay state tax at all, because the tax on their incomes does not exceed the standard deductions. The rates for the state income tax are shown in the following table:

The Tax Administration collects income taxes from each paycheck, and then pays the difference between tax liability and taxes paid as tax rebate or collects as tax arrears afterward. The decision is sent to the taxpayer between May and October the following year. Tax rebates, if any, are typically paid approximately two months following. The employer is responsible for choosing the pension insurance company; the employee has no say. The pensions of public sector employers are handled by the dedicated agency Keva.

Corporate income & capital income taxes

The income from dividends, rents, and capital gains are taxed with capital income tax. In 2017 the capital income is taxed at a fixed rate of 30% or 34% for income that exceeds 30,000 euro. Some companies have a different taxation depending on if they are listed or not. Public companies have 15% of their dividends tax-exempt. The effective dividend tax rate is thus 25.5% - 28.9%.

However, taxation of the dividends from non-listed companies is much lower. As much as 75% of these dividends is tax-exempt up until 150,000 €. This still includes a condition that the dividend must be under or equal to 8% of the mathematical value of the stock (portion of net assets for a single share). 75% of the part that exceeds the 8% boundary will be taxed instead as earned income. If an individual gets more than 150,000 € in dividends from non-listed limited companies, the tax-exempt percentage will only be 15% for the amount that exceeds 150,000 €. The effective tax rate for a dividend that does not exceed 8% of the value of a stock will be 7.5% - 8.5%. Due to the effect of net assets, dividends of debted private companies will usually have their dividends taxed as earned income.

The corporate income tax rate is 20.0%. The corporate tax was fully paid as dividend tax before 2004, but because of neutrality requirements of the EU, the tax credits allowed for dividends are now more complex. Corporate tax was lowered from 24.5% to 20.0% in January 2014.

Property taxes
Municipal property taxes are low, since municipalities mostly meet their funding needs via direct income taxes and state subsidies. Tax rates are higher for leisure properties like summer cottages. Property taxes are levied annually on present market value. General rates are 0.60–1.35%, 0.32-0.75% on regular housing and 0.50-1.00% on leisure properties.

There is a 4% property transfer tax for property, and 1.6% for stock and housing cooperative shares. First-time home buyers home are exempt.

Consumption taxes
VAT is levied at a standard rate of 24% (January 2013), and two reduced rates of 14% on food, restaurant services, catering services and animal feed, and 10% on books, pharmaceutical products, services creating opportunities for physical exercise, passenger transportation and accommodation.

Excise taxes are in place for alcohol, tobacco, sweets, lotteries, insurances, transport fuels and automobiles (2011). The motor vehicle tax is substantial. As a rule, permanent residents cannot drive foreign-registered cars in Finland. Persons with permanent residence outside Finland may drive foreign-registered car in Finland for six months, or up to 18 months if residence abroad is separately proven to Customs. As an exception, European Civil Service employees working for the European Union are exempt from the car tax for their personal vehicle.

Pharmacies pay only the excise tax from their yearly income; no VAT is levied on medications. There is a tax credit for pharmacies that keep subsidiary pharmacies (sivuapteekki). The aim of this policy is to support keeping pharmacies in sparsely populated regions.

Church taxes
Taxes are collected from members of the two official churches, Evangelical Lutheran Church of Finland and Finnish Orthodox Church, and two country-wide Lutheran parishes; the German parish in Finland and Olaus Petri parish for citizens of Sweden living in Finland. The tax rates vary from 1% to 2% of earned income. Persons that are not members of these churches are exempted from paying. A small percentage, 2.55% as of 2011, of corporate taxes is also distributed to parishes. Corporates pay church tax regardless of corporations' religious status.

Publicity of income taxes
Even when information of earnings and the taxation procedure of individual persons and companies are not public, the amount of taxes carried for each person and company is public information. Tax Administration authority is required to submit information for free if request is targeted. Larger records are submitted for journalistic purposes. Capital income and earned income are both public information, while taxation of dividends from unlisted limited company is not.

Taxation of non-residents
Anyone who has arrived in Finland and stayed longer than 6 months will become, from Tax Administrator's view, a resident. The residents' worldwide income is subject to Finnish tax, so that no distinction exists between the source country. Non-residents are subjected only to taxation of Finnish-sourced income.

ID number and tax number
Persons working in Finland for a short period can get their Finnish personal ID at the tax office. The Finnish Tax Administration is entitled to enter information into the Population Register System and distribute identity codes jointly with Local Register Offices if the matter concerns foreigners who arrive for temporary periods, i.e. less than one year to work in Finland. ID requires following information entered to the system: Full name, Date of birth, Sex, Place of birth, Address, Citizenship, Native language and Occupation.

In association of measures against grey economy in the construction industry, A new Act governing the mandatory Tax Numbers and the public Register of Tax Numbers was adopted in 2012. At the moment mandatory Tax Numbers are issued for construction-industry workers only. The Individual Tax Number does not reveal the individual's age, sex or date of birth. The number doesn't change when a worker moves on to work for another employer or to work at another construction site.

Withholding tax for foreign wage earners with special expertise
Under the Act on Withholding Tax for Foreign Wage Earners with Special Expertise (1995), a withholding tax of 35% is levied instead of State income tax on earned income and communal tax. The withholding tax is applied to foreign employees under the following conditions:

 the individual becomes resident in Finland at the beginning of the period of employment to which the Act applies
 the pecuniary salary for this employment is at least 5,800 euros a month during the total period of employment to which the Act applies
 his tasks require special expertise
 he is not a Finnish national and he has not been resident in Finland in the five years preceding the year in which this employment began.

A taxpayer is deemed to be a foreign expert for a maximum of 48 months from the beginning of the employment.

Officials of the European Union 
Salaries or grants paid by the European Union bodies, such as European Chemicals Agency in Helsinki, are tax-free in Finland and do not need to be reported to the Finnish Tax Administration or Finnish social security, regardless of residency. Employees of European Union bodies may bring a car to Finland without paying the Finnish car tax.

See also
 Economy of Finland

References

Further reading

External links
 Ministry of Finance
 Finnish Tax Administration
 Findicator - Taxes and tax-like payments 1975-, ratio to GDP

Finland
Economy of Finland